Drăgănești-Vlașca is a commune in Teleorman County, Muntenia, Romania. It is composed of three villages: Comoara, Drăgănești-Vlașca and Văceni.

References

Communes in Teleorman County
Localities in Muntenia